Slaughter Night (Dutch: Slachtnacht, stylised as Sl8n8) is a 2006 Dutch-Belgian horror film written and directed by Edwin Visser and Frank van Geloven.

Plot
Eighteen-year-old Kristel survives a car accident in which her father dies. Tormented by nocturnal visions she continues her father's investigation of serial killers – especially Andries Martíns, a child killer. She decides to visit an abandoned mine, with a little group of friends from college, where her father headed the investigations on Andries. In the dark, abandoned mine shafts, convicted murderers used to be used as 'firefighters' to detect explosives, which was a job that normally nobody survived.

When the group arrives at the mine, the shaft lift suddenly drops 60 metres. The students must now find a way out of the dilapidated mine maze but they are not alone. The spirit of Martins is more bloodthirsty than ever. Kristel and her friends spend the night in the mine but the trip becomes more and more of a nightmare and a battle for survival.

Cast
 Victoria Koblenko as Kristel Lodema
  as Paul
  as Mark
 Carolina Dijkhuizen as Liesbeth
 Lara Toorop as Susan
 Steve Hooi as Ruud
  as Louis Corpus
 Linda van der Steen as Estrild
 Emiel Sandtke	as Stefan
 Martijn Oversteegen as Martin Lodema
 Liz Snoyink as Carla Lodema
 Michaël van Buuren as Toine 
 Hans Ligtvoet	as Vital Houcks
 Robert Eleveld as Andries Martiens
 Rutger Lagestee as Jonge martiens
 Geena Maas as Anna
 Teun Lagestee	as Jochem
 Kris van Veelen as Agent
 Paul Wuijts as Opzichter
 Marjan Lammers as Moeder Martiens
 Jeroen Planting as Vader martiens
 Vincent Gerris as Agent
 Eva-Marijn Stegemann as Scholiere
 Theu Boermans	as Gaston
 Harrie Wiessenhaan as Vrachtwagenchauffeur

Production
The production, script and direction were made by Frank van Geloven and Edwin Visser, who worked five years on the project. Victoria Koblenko made in this film his third appearance in a horror film and was promptly appointed to the Dutch scream queen of horror. A small part of the team that created the special effects for The Lord of the Rings, worked on this film and made the Make-up effects. The Amsterdam company UNREAL, specializes in visual effects, such as Special Effects Makeup, Props and Special Realistic Dummies has created the FX effects.

Release
The film premiered alongside Doodeind and Horizonica at the Dutch Film Festival on 5 October 2006. In North America premiered on 24 October 2006 as part of the Toronto After Dark Film Festival and was first time released at DVD on 10 February 2007 at European Film Market. The film came in a box set along with Sheitan and Carved.

Soundtrack
The opening title was the 1974 hard rock song Love Me Like a Lion from BZN.

References

External links
Official website

2006 films
2006 horror films
2006 psychological thriller films
Belgian slasher films
Dutch slasher films
Dutch thriller films
Films set in Belgium
Films shot in the Netherlands
2000s Dutch-language films
2000s English-language films